Epilacydes bayoni is a moth of the family Erebidae. It was described by Emilio Berio in 1935 and is found in Uganda.

References

 Arctiidae genus list at Butterflies and Moths of the World of the Natural History Museum

Endemic fauna of Uganda
Spilosomina
Moths described in 1935